Emile Jean Marie Henri Joseph Destombe (15 August 1935 – 28 January 2016) was a French Roman Catholic bishop.  He was a member of the Société des Missions Étrangères de Paris (Paris Mission Society).

Biography
Born in Roncq, France, Emile Destombes was ordained to the priesthood in 1961. In 1997, Emile Destombes was appointed coadjutor vicar apostolic of Phnom Penh, Cambodia and succeeded in 2001 retiring in 2010.

See also

Notes

1935 births
2016 deaths
French Roman Catholic bishops in Asia